Lee Byung-woo (born January 22, 1965) is a South Korean guitarist and composer of film scores. He has composed music for more than twenty films, including the segment "Memories" in Three (2002), A Tale of Two Sisters (2003), All for Love (2005), The Host (2006) and Mother (2009).

Lee's music for A Tale of Two Sisters was described by OhmyNews as "one of the best film scores ever composed for a Korean film". He won Best Music at the 2004 Shanghai International Film Festival for Untold Scandal, and in 2006 his score for The King and the Clown won the same accolade at the Blue Dragon Film Awards. In 2007, Lee received a further Best Music nomination at the 44th Grand Bell Awards for For Horowitz.

Filmography 

 Three Friends (1996)
 Kill the Love (1996)
 My Beautiful Girl, Mari (2002)
 My Beautiful Days (2002)
 Three ("Memories") (2002)
 A Tale of Two Sisters (2003)
 Untold Scandal (2003)
 Rules of Dating (2005)
 The Red Shoes (2005)
 All for Love (2005)
 The King and the Clown (2005)
 For Horowitz (2006)
 The Host (2006)

 Voice of a Murderer (2007)
 Miracle on 1st Street (2007)
 Soo (2007)
 Bunt (2007)
 My Son (2007)
 Hansel and Gretel (2007)
 Tokyo! (2008)
 Haeundae (2009)
 Mother (2009)
 Harmony (2010)
 Romantic Heaven (2010)
 The Face Reader (2013)
 Ode to My Father (2014)

References 

 "Gonggil’s Theme", The Dong-a Ilbo, 10 May 2006. Retrieved on 26 October 2008.
 Chun Su-jin, "You may not know his name but you’ve heard his music", JoongAng Daily, 19 July 2007. Retrieved on 26 October 2008.
 "Music director of 'The Host' Lee, Byeong-Woo makes his first online game soundtrack", Koreacontent.org, 22 February 2008. Retrieved on 26 October 2008.
 Han Sang-hee, "Guitarist Lee to Perform For Fans", The Korea Times, 20 October 2008. Retrieved on 26 October 2008.

External links 
 Lee Byung-woo at HanCinema
 
 
 

1965 births
Living people
South Korean film score composers
Peabody Institute alumni